Ujście is a town in Greater Poland Voivodeship, west-central Poland.

Ujście (which means "(river) mouth" or "confluence" in Polish) may also refer to the following places:
Ujście, Lublin Voivodeship (east Poland)
Ujście, Braniewo County in Warmian-Masurian Voivodeship (north Poland)
Ujście, Elbląg County in Warmian-Masurian Voivodeship (north Poland)

See also
Ujście Warty National Park, a protected area near the confluence of the Warta and Oder
Ujście Warty Landscape Park, a similar but wider-ranging area